Amanda Seyfried is an American actress who has received numerous accolades throughout her career.

Seyfried came to prominence following her feature film debut in the teen comedy Mean Girls (2004), for which she received an MTV Movie & TV Award. She then appeared in the romantic comedy films Dear John and Letters to Juliet (both 2010), earning various nominations at the Teen Choice Awards, and the black comedy horror Jennifer's Body (2009), which won her a second MTV Movie & TV Award. She starred in the ABBA-inspired musicals Mamma Mia! (2008) and its sequel Mamma Mia! Here We Go Again (2018), for which she was nominated for two People's Choice Awards, and the period musical Les Misérables (2012), which earned her a nomination for the Screen Actors Guild Award for Outstanding Performance by a Cast in a Motion Picture.

Seyfried received critical acclaim for her portrayal of Marion Davies in David Fincher's biopic Mank (2020), earning nominations in the Best Supporting Actress category at the Academy Awards, AACTA International Awards, Critics' Choice Movie Awards, and Golden Globe Awards. This acclaim continued for her starring role as Elizabeth Holmes in the drama miniseries The Dropout (2022), for which she won the Primetime Emmy Award for Outstanding Lead Actress in a Limited or Anthology Series or Movie and the Golden Globe Award for Best Actress in a Limited or Anthology Series or Television Film.

Awards and nominations

Notes

References

External links
  

Seyfried, Amanda